Artaxa drucei is a species of  moth in the genus Artaxa found in Papua New Guinea. There are 13 collected specimens, all at the Smithsonian Institution's National Museum of Natural History.

References 
 

Lymantriinae